The Christian River is a  tributary of the Yukon River in the U.S. state of Alaska. Beginning near Shark Edge Mountain in the southern Brooks Range, it flows generally south to Cutoff Slough and thence to the larger river.

See also
List of rivers of Alaska

References

Rivers of Alaska
Rivers of Yukon–Koyukuk Census Area, Alaska
Tributaries of the Yukon River
Rivers of Unorganized Borough, Alaska